Lutz Bachmann (born 26 January 1973) is the founder of the Pegida movement, a far-right German political organisation linked to the anti-Muslim counter-jihad ideology.

History

Personal life
Born in 1973 in Dresden, East Germany, Bachmann had a working-class upbringing. Time reports that he is the son of a butcher. He was a (trained) chef and graphic designer, and played professional soccer for teams in Dresden and Düsseldorf. Bachmann has a criminal record for sixteen burglaries, dealing cocaine and assault. In 1998, after Bachmann had been sentenced to several years in prison, he fled to South Africa but was deported back to Germany. According to Bachmann, during his time as a fugitive, he opened a nightclub in Cape Town which catered to black people. This was not long after the end of apartheid, and Bachmann says, "It was scandalous. People were shouting at me, 'How can you do this as a German, as a white? How can you open a night club for blacks?'" Bachmann says, "I became a refugee. But a refugee from German law". Bachmann is the owner of a public relations and advertising company in Dresden that he founded in 1992, and has been a publicist for nightclubs.

Pegida

Bachmann started Pegida in October 2014 to protest plans to add 14 refugee centres in Dresden, Germany. Through Pegida he rallied the disparate forces of the German right against the "parallel societies" of Muslims in Europe. Bachmann publicly renounces extremist violence of any kind and insists his enemy is not religion itself. As a result of his involvement with Pegida he has been threatened with death and had to cancel a march in Dresden.

In mid-January 2015, Bachmann was criticised after a photograph surfaced showing him with a mustache and hair style similar to Adolf Hitler. According to Bachmann, it was an old photo that was meant as a joke. After the photo sparked international outrage, Bachmann stepped down as de facto leader of Pegida. According to Bachmann and Pegida co-founder Kathrin Oertel, Bachmann's resignation had nothing to do with the photo. A few weeks later, Bachmann was reinstated as a co-leader following a vote. The Sächsische Zeitung later reported that the moustache was added after the photo was taken, with Bachmann asserting that it was a "forgery".

Bachmann attempted to enter the United Kingdom in mid-March 2018, but was blocked and deported. An immigration official said the British authorities to refuse admission to individuals whose presence was "not conducive to the public good".

Prosecution
In 2016, Bachmann was charged with incitement of racial hatred. The charges were laid after someone using a Facebook page with Lutz Bachmann's name called refugees "cattle," "scumbags," and "filth" in a Facebook post in 2014. The first day of Bachmann's trial, which was originally planned on being split into three separate days, took place on 19 April 2016. Bachmann's lawyer, Katja Reichel, argued that there are hundreds of Facebook pages with the name Lutz Bachmann on Facebook, and that there was no reason to believe that the Lutz Bachmann being accused was the one who made these comments. State attorney Tobias Uhlemann has pointed out that nothing originating from the Internet would constitute evidence. On 3 May 2016, Bachmann was convicted of "inciting racial hatred" and fined €9,600. Both the defense as well the prosecution were planning on appealing the ruling. In October 2016, Lutz Bachmann moved to live in the south of the island of Tenerife (Spain) where he was declared persona non grata by the authorities of that island.

Freiheitlich Direktdemokratische Volkspartei
Bachmann has set up the new party FDDV, Freiheitlich Direktdemokratische Volkspartei (Liberal Direct Democratic People's Party). The party was established on 13 June 2016.

References

External links

Meet the German Activist Leading the Movement Against 'Islamization', Time
The man behind Germany's anti-Islam street protests, AFP

Living people
1973 births
Counter-jihad activists
Politicians from Dresden
German critics of Islam
German activists
People convicted of racial hatred offences